UKUI is a desktop environment for Linux distributions and other UNIX-like operating systems, originally developed for Ubuntu Kylin, and written using the Qt framework.

UKUI (Ubuntu Kylin User Interface) is a desktop environment initially developed to work on Ubuntu Kylin, a Linux distribution that is one of Ubuntu's official flavors. UKUI is a fork of the MATE Desktop Environment.

It is a lightweight desktop environment, which consumes few resources and works with older computers. It has been developed with GTK and Qt technologies. Its visual appearance is similar to Windows 7, making it easier for new users of Linux.

Gallery

References 

Free desktop environments
Ubuntu derivatives